Aloxistatin (loxistatin, E-64d, EST) is a drug which acts as a cysteine protease inhibitor and has anticoagulant effects. It is a synthetic analogue of E-64, a natural product derived from fungi. It was researched for the treatment of muscular dystrophy but was not successful in human clinical trials, though it has continued to be investigated for treatment of spinal cord injury, stroke and Alzheimer's disease. It also shows antiviral effects.

References 

Anticoagulants
Antiviral drugs
Ethyl esters
Epoxides
Carboxamides
Dipeptides